Route 38 is a highway in southern Missouri.  Its eastern terminus is at Route 17 ten miles (16 km) west of Houston; its western terminus is at U.S. Route 65 about ten miles (16 km) south of Buffalo.

Major intersections

References

038
Transportation in Dallas County, Missouri
Transportation in Webster County, Missouri
Transportation in Wright County, Missouri
Transportation in Texas County, Missouri